Love and Other Solitudes (Spanish: Del amor y otras soledades) is a 1969 Spanish drama film directed by Basilio Martín Patino and starring Lucia Bosé, Carlos Estrada and María Massip.

Cast
 Lucia Bosé as María  
 Carlos Estrada as Alejandro Lenador  
 María Massip as Amalia  
 Maria Aurèlia Capmany as Psicóloga  
 Alfredo Mañas as Andrés  
 Joaquim Jordà 
 Carmelo A. Bernaola as Fernando  
 Matilde Muñoz Sampedro as Madre de María  
 Rafael Bardem as Padre de María  
 Paloma Cela as Inmaculada  
 Julia Peña  
 Mario Pardo as Santi - estudiante de económicas  
 Manolo Otero as Nacho  
 Iván Tubau
 Carmen Martínez Sierra as Mujer de don Julio  
 Juan José Otegui as Electricista  
 Alfredo Santacruz as De la fábrica de electrodomésticos  
 Marisol as herself

References

Bibliography 
 Bentley, Bernard. A Companion to Spanish Cinema. Boydell & Brewer 2008.

External links 
 

1969 drama films
Spanish drama films
1969 films
1960s Spanish-language films
Films directed by Basilio Martín Patino
Films scored by Carmelo Bernaola
1960s Spanish films